Andrew Hill (June 30, 1931 – April 20, 2007) was an American jazz pianist and composer.

Jazz critic John Fordham described Hill as a "uniquely gifted composer, pianist and educator" although "his status remained largely inside knowledge in the jazz world for most of his career."

Hill recorded for Blue Note Records for nearly a decade, producing a dozen albums.

Biography

Early life
Andrew Hill was born in Chicago, Illinois, to William and Hattie Hill. He had a brother, Robert, who was a singer and classical violin player. Hill took up the piano at the age of thirteen, and was encouraged by Earl Hines. As a child, he attended the University of Chicago Experimental School. He was referred by jazz composer Bill Russo to Paul Hindemith, with whom he studied informally until 1952.

While a teenager, he performed in rhythm and blues bands and with touring jazz musicians, including Charlie Parker and Miles Davis. Hill recalls some of his experience as a youngster, during a 1964 interview with Leonard Feather: "I started out in music as a boy soprano, singing and playing the accordion, and tap dancing. I had a little act and made quite a few of the talent shows around town from 1943 until 1947. I won turkeys at two Thanksgiving parties at the Regal Theatre," parties sponsored by the newspaper Chicago Defender, which Hill coincidentally used to sell on the streets.

Career
In 1950, Hill learned his first blues changes on the piano from the saxophonist Pat Patrick and in 1953, he played his first professional job as a musician, with Paul Williams' band. "At that time", he recalls, "I was playing baritone sax as well as piano." During the next few years, the piano gigs brought him into contact with many musicians, some of whom became relevant influences: Joe Segal and Barry Harris, among others. In 1961, after travelling as an accompanist for Dinah Washington, the young pianist settled in New York City in 1961, where he worked for Johnny Hartman and Al Hibbler, then briefly moved to Los Angeles County, where he worked with Roland Kirk's quartet and at the jazz club Lighthouse Café, in Hermosa Beach.

Hill first recorded as a sideman in 1954, but his reputation was made by his Blue Note recordings as leader from 1963 to 1970, which featured several other important post-bop musicians including Joe Chambers, Richard Davis, Eric Dolphy, Bobby Hutcherson, Joe Henderson, Freddie Hubbard, Elvin Jones, Woody Shaw, Tony Williams, and John Gilmore. Hill also played on albums by Henderson, Hutcherson, and Hank Mobley. His compositions accounted for three of the five pieces on Bobby Hutcherson's Dialogue album.

Hill rarely worked as a sideman after the 1960s, preferring to play his own compositions. This may have limited his public exposure. He later taught in California and held a tenure-track faculty appointment at Portland State University from 1989 to 1996. While at PSU, he established a Summer Jazz Intensive program, in addition to performing, conducting workshops and attending residencies at Wesleyan University, the University of Michigan, the University of Toronto, Harvard University, Bennington College and other schools.

Hill's album Dusk was selected best album of 2001 by both DownBeat and JazzTimes; and in 2003, Hill received the Jazzpar Prize. Hill's earlier work also received renewed attention as a result of the belated release of several unissued sessions recorded in the 1960s for Blue Note, notably the ambitious large-group date Passing Ships. In 2004, he appeared on SOLOS: The Jazz Sessions. As a consequence of his renewed prominence, a new Blue Note album titled Time Lines was released on February 21, 2006.

His final public performance was on March 29, 2007 at Trinity Church in New York City.

Private life
It was while working at the Lighthouse Café, in Hermosa Beach that he met his future wife, Laverne Gillette, at the time an organist at the Red Carpet. They married in 1963 and moved to New York.

Laverne died following a long illness in California, where the couple had settled, in 1989. He married dancer/educator Joanne Robinson Hill in Portland in 1992. They moved to New York City in 1995. From 2000, Hill and his wife lived in Jersey City, New Jersey.

Andrew Hill suffered from lung cancer during the last years of his life. He died at his home in Jersey City, New Jersey.

In May 2007, he became the first person to receive a posthumous honorary doctorate from Berklee College of Music.

Playing style
Hill's main influences were pianists Thelonious Monk, Bud Powell and Art Tatum. "Monk's like Ravel and Debussy to me, in that he put a lot of personality into his playing [...] it's the personality of music which makes it, finally," he said in a 1963 interview with A. B. Spellman. Powell was an even greater influence, but Hill thought that his music was a dead end: "If you stay with Bud too much, you'll always sound like him, even if you're doing something he never did." Hill referred to Tatum as the epitome of "all modern piano playing".

Discography

As leader 

Source:

Compilations
 Mosaic Select 16: Andrew Hill (Mosaic)
 Mosaic Select 23: Andrew Hill-Solo (Mosaic)
The Complete Blue Note Andrew Hill Sessions (1963-66) (Mosaic)

As sideman 
With Walt Dickerson
 To My Queen (New Jazz, 1963) – recorded in 1962

With Roland Kirk
 Domino (Mercury, 1962)

With Jimmy Woods
 Conflict (Contemporary, 1963)

With Hank Mobley
 No Room for Squares (Blue Note, 1964) – recorded in 1963

With Joe Henderson
 Our Thing (Blue Note, 1963)

With Bobby Hutcherson
 Dialogue (Blue Note, 1965)

With Russel Baba
 Earth Prayer (Ruda Music, 1992)

With Reggie Workman
 Summit Conference (Postcards, 1994) – recorded in 1993

With Greg Osby
 The Invisible Hand (Blue Note, 2000) – recorded in 1999

Notes

References

External links

 Official site
 Andrew Hill discography
 Washington Post obituary
 RBMA Radio On Demand, Andrew Hill Tribute 

1931 births
2007 deaths
20th-century American composers
20th-century American pianists
American jazz composers
American jazz pianists
American male pianists
American music educators
Avant-garde jazz pianists
Blue Note Records artists
Colgate University alumni
Deaths from cancer in New Jersey
Hall, Andrew
American male jazz composers
Modal jazz pianists
Musicians from Jersey City, New Jersey
Palmetto Records artists
Portland State University faculty
Pupils of Paul Hindemith
SteepleChase Records artists
Wesleyan University people
Jazz musicians from New York (state)
20th-century American male musicians
20th-century jazz composers